Muhammad Nasiruddin Nasir (Jawi: محمد ناصرالدين ناصر) also known as Nasiruddin Nasir is a Malaysian actor of Indian-Muslim descent.  He is known for portraying Satiya in Hikayat Putera Syazlan and as Suresh in Disney's Waktu Rehat.

Filmography

Film
Tentang Bulan (About the Moon)
Brainscan: Aku dan Topi Ajaib (Brainscan: Me and the Magical Hat)
9 September
Semerah Cinta Stiletto (As Red as Stiletto's Love)

Drama
Hikayat Putera Shazlan (The Tale of Prince Shazlan) Season 1,2 & 3
Waktu Rehat (The Break Time) Season 1,2 & 3
Tentang Bulan the Series.
Klon TV2 
Kampung Simpang Burung TV3
Kelas Sebelah RTM1
Udin dan Noni (EDU WEB TV)
Khatan Astro Prima
Biarkan dia berlari RTM
CDKET (Cari Duit Poket) Raya RTM
Selamat Hari Raya 'sayangku'
Nana Nini Nunu
Kad Raya untuk Tun Dr Mahathir
Alang Menanti Malang (Astro Warna)
Puteri Pulau Tuba RTM 2
E-Toyol.com TV3
Malam 7 Likur NTV7
Jan Jan Jala RTM

Theater
Telur Oh Telur
Teater Tari Naga Tasik Chini

Commercial
Telekom Malaysia (TM)
Ribena
Tune Talk (Justin Bieber)

Hosting
Kids On2
PMR TVIQ

Education

Degree
Bachelor of Accounting (Hons.)
Universiti Tenaga Nasional

References

1992 births
Living people
Malaysian people of Indian descent
Malaysian people of Malay descent
Malaysian Muslims
21st-century Malaysian male actors
Malaysian male television actors
Malaysian male voice actors